Mark Medoff (March 18, 1940 – April 23, 2019) was an American playwright, screenwriter, film and theatre director, actor, and professor.  His play Children of a Lesser God received both the Tony Award and the Olivier Award.  He was nominated for an Academy Award and a Writers Guild of America Best Adapted Screenplay Award for the film script of Children of a Lesser God and for a Cable ACE Award for his HBO Premiere movie, Apology.  He also received an Obie Award for his play When You Comin' Back, Red Ryder? Medoff's feature film Refuge was released in 2010.

When You Comin' Back, Red Ryder? was adapted into a film with a screenplay by Medoff in 1979.

Biography

Early life
Medoff was born on 18 March 1940 in Mount Carmel, Illinois, to a Jewish family, the son of Thelma Irene (Butt), a psychologist, and Lawrence R. Medoff, a physician. He was raised in Miami Beach. In 1967, while working as an instructor at the Capitol Radio Engineering Institute in Washington, D.C., he wrote his first play, The Wager. His first play to be staged in New York City was When You Comin' Back, Red Ryder?, which won him the 1974 Drama Desk and Obie Awards for Outstanding New Playwright.

Education
Medoff received his Bachelor of Arts degree from the University of Miami and his Master's from Stanford University. Medoff also received an honorary degree in 1981 from Gallaudet University.

Awards and nominations
Medoff's big breakthrough and most famous work was 1979's Children of a Lesser God, which won him the Tony, Drama Desk, and Laurence Olivier Awards for Best Play. Medoff was back on Broadway again with the staging of his play Prymate in 2005.

Medoff's screen credits include adaptations of his plays Red Ryder and Children of a Lesser God, for which he was nominated for an Oscar, BAFTA, and Writers Guild of America Award, Clara's Heart (for which he cast, and subsequently "discovered", Neil Patrick Harris), and City of Joy. In 2000, he produced and directed the documentary Who Fly on Angels’ Wings, about a mobile pediatric unit traveling through the under-served regions of southern New Mexico, and the following year he directed the feature film Children on Their Birthdays, based on the short story by Truman Capote.

Teaching
Medoff was co-founder of the American Southwest Theatre Company and head of the Department of Theatre Arts for nine years at New Mexico State University, where he was a professor for a total of twenty-seven years and taught Screenwriting and Acting for Film, Short Film Production, and Film Directing and Producing. He was also the Creative Director of the Creative Media Institute at NMSU, the film department at the university. The theater department is still the American Southwest Theater Company.

For one semester a year between 2003–06, he worked at Florida State University as a Reynolds Eminent Scholar in the School of Theatre. In the spring semester of 2008 he joined the faculty of the University of Houston School of Theatre and Dance as Distinguished Lecturer.  He was the winner of the Kennedy Center Medallion for Excellence in Education and Artistic Achievement, given periodically to professionals in theater who also teach and mentor students.

Personal life and death
Medoff was married to second wife Stephanie Thorne from 1972 until his death in 2019; they had three daughters.

In April 2019, he entered hospice care after battling cancer in his later years and suffering a fall. He died on April 23, 2019, from complications at age 79.

Bibliography

Plays
The Wager, 1966
The Odyssey of Jeremy Jack, (w/ Carleene Johnson, 1973)
The Kramer, 1973
When You Comin' Back, Red Ryder?, 1974
The Halloween Bandit, 1978
The Conversion of Aaron Weiss, 1978
Firekeeper, 1978
The Last Chance Saloon, 1979
The Froegle Dictum, 1980
Children of a Lesser God, 1980
The Majestic Kid, 1981
The Hands of Its Enemy, 1984
Kringle's Window, 1985.
The Heart Outright, 1986
The Homage That Follows, 1995
Showdown on Rio Road (with Ross Marks, 1998).
 Crunch Time, (with Phil Treon, 1998).
 Gila, 1996.
 Gunfighter - A Gulf War Chronicle, 1997
 A Christmas Carousel, 1997.
 Tommy J and Sally, 2000.
 The Same Life Over, 2002.
 Prymate, 2003.
 The Dramaturgy of Mark Medoff, 2004.
 Marilee and Baby Lamb: Assassination of an American Goddess, 2015.

Radio plays
The Disintegration of Aaron Weiss, 1979
The Last Chance Saloon, 1980

Screenplays
Good Guys Wear Black, 1978
When You Comin' Back, Red Ryder, 1979
Off Beat, 1986
Apology, 1986
Children of a Lesser God, 1986
Clara's Heart, 1987
City of Joy, 1992
Showdown on Rio Road, 1993
Homage, 1995
Santa Fe, 1997
100 MPG, 2006
Refuge, 2010
Walking with Herb, 2021

Acting and directing
Medoff's theatre directing credits include Waiting for Godot, The Effect of Gamma Rays on Man-in-the-Moon Marigolds, Jacques Brel is Alive and Well and Living in Paris, One Flew Over the Cuckoo's Nest, Equus, and Hot L Baltimore. As an actor, he has appeared in the plays Marat/Sade, Black Comedy/White Lies, and Old Times, among others, and the films The Twilight of the Golds, Santa Fe, Homage, Red Ryder, and Clara's Heart.

References

External links

1940 births
2019 deaths
American male dramatists and playwrights
American male screenwriters
20th-century American Jews
Film directors from Illinois
Jewish American dramatists and playwrights
Jewish American screenwriters
New Mexico State University faculty
People from Mount Carmel, Illinois
Screenwriters from New York (state)
Screenwriters from Illinois
Screenwriters from Texas
Screenwriters from New Mexico
Stanford University alumni
Tony Award winners
University of Houston faculty
University of Miami alumni
20th-century American male actors
20th-century American dramatists and playwrights
20th-century American male writers
21st-century American dramatists and playwrights
21st-century American male writers
Accidental deaths from falls
21st-century American Jews